The TC2000 (Turismo Competición 2000, formerly Súper TC2000) is a touring car racing series held in Argentina since 1979.

Rules
This was both to reduce running costs, and give a level playing field to every team. Variable valve timing, variable intake geometry, anti-lock braking systems and traction control are all forbidden.

From the 2012 season, Radical Performance Engines will provide  RPE TCX V8 engines (a front-wheel-drive variant of the RPX, originally found in the Radical SR8), capable of producing , in place of the previous  engines. The series was renamed to Súper TC2000. Meanwhile, cars with the old regulation continue competing as a second-tier championship with the name TC2000, currently with an independent calendar.

The V8 engines were finally replaced from the year 2019 by new provider, the French manufacturer Oreca, these being  turbocharged 4-cylinder in-line.

In 2022, the series changed its name again. The Super TC2000 got its name back from the TC2000 and the TC2000 was renamed the TC2000 Series.

TC2000 teams

2022 season 
Works teams:
 Chevrolet YPF - Chevrolet Cruze
 Puma Energy Honda Racing - Honda Civic
 Toyota Gazoo Racing YPF Infinia - Toyota Corolla

Private teams:
 Axion Energy Sport
 Toyota Gazoo Racing Junior
 FDC Motorsport
 FR Motorsport
 JM Motorsport

Scoring system

Champions

Broadcasting rights

Radio 
  Colombia:

Televisión  
  Brazil: SporTV, Premiere Esportes 1, Multiesporte, Premiere Esportes 4, GNT 4
  Colombia: Canal RCN, Win Sports and Win Sports+

See also
 Stock Car Brasil
 Turismo Carretera

References

External links

 
 

 
Touring car racing series
Recurring sporting events established in 1979